Stirling Lines is a British Army garrison in Credenhill, Herefordshire; the headquarters of the 22 Special Air Service Regiment (22 SAS) and the  Special Reconnaissance Regiment(SRR). The site was formerly a Royal Air Force (RAF) non-flying station for training schools, known as RAF Credenhill.

History
In 1958, the Special Air Service (SAS) was temporarily based at Merebrook Camp in Malvern, Worcestershire, a former emergency military hospital that had remained largely unused since 1945. In 1960, the SAS moved to a former Royal Artillery boys' training unit, Bradbury Lines in Hereford, which was renamed in 1984 to Stirling Lines in honour of the regiment's founder, Lieutenant Colonel David Stirling. In 1994, the RAF ceased using RAF Credenhill; the Army then obtaining the site to redevelop as a new base for the SAS; works commenced in 1997. The SAS commenced relocation of staff and equipment to Credenhill from Hereford with the redevelopment of the site. The move was completed in May 1999. On 30 September 2000, the official opening ceremony was held for the new Stirling Lines with the clock tower re-erected on the new parade ground. The Hereford site was sold to a property developer in March 2001.

Based units
The following units are based at Stirling Lines:

22 Special Air Service Regiment
A Squadron
B Squadron
D Squadron
G Squadron
Special Reconnaissance Regiment
18 Signal Regiment
264 (SAS) Signal Squadron
67 (SRR) Signal Squadron
658 Squadron AAC – Eurocopter AS365N3 Dauphin II, Westland Gazelle AH1

References

Training establishments of the British Army
Installations of the British Army